Butler University is a private university in Indianapolis, Indiana. Founded in 1855 and named after founder Ovid Butler, the university has over 60 major academic fields of study in six colleges: the Lacy School of Business, College of Communication, College of Education, College of Liberal Arts and Sciences, College of Pharmacy and Health Sciences, and Jordan College of the Arts.

History

On January 15, 1850, the Indiana General Assembly adopted Ovid Butler's proposed charter for a new Christian university in Indianapolis. After five years in development, the school opened on November 1, 1855, as North-Western Christian University at 13th Street and College Avenue on Indianapolis's near northside at the eastern edge of the present-day Old Northside Historic District. Attorney and university founder Ovid Butler provided the property. The university was founded by members of the Christian Church (Disciples of Christ), although it was never controlled by the church. The university's charter called for "a non-sectarian institution free from the taint of slavery, offering instruction in every branch of liberal and professional education." The university was the first in Indiana and the third in the United States to admit both men and women.

The university established the first professorship in English literature and the first Department of English in the state of Indiana. In 1869 Ovid Butler endowed the Demia Butler Chair of English Literature in honor of his daughter who died in 1867. Demia Butler was the first woman to graduate from the Classical course at the university. The chair was the first endowed position at an American university designated for a female professor. Catharine Merrill, was the first to occupy the Demia Butler Chair of English Literature in 1869. Merrill was just the second female university professor in the country. Today the Demia Butler Chair of English Literature is occupied by Susan Neville.

The university moved to a new site in the community of Irvington, on the east side of Indianapolis, in 1875, and changed its name to Butler University in 1877.

The university's department of religion became a separate Christian Church seminary and "college of applied Christianity" in 1924; it was variously called the School of Religion and the College of Religion.

In 1930, Butler merged with the Teachers College of Indianapolis, founded by Eliza Cooper Blaker, creating the university's second college. The third college, the College of Business Administration, was established in 1937, and the College of Pharmacy and Health Sciences was established in 1945, following a merger that absorbed the Indianapolis College of Pharmacy. The Jordan College of Fine Arts, the university's fifth college, was established in 1951, following a merger with the Arthur Jordan Conservatory of Music. Butler's School of Religion, established in 1924, became independent in 1958 and is currently known as the Christian Theological Seminary.

Campuses

Irvington campus

The original location of the school was 13th Street and College Avenue on the near-northside of Indianapolis. In 1875, the university was renamed for Ovid Butler "in recognition of Ovid Butler's inspirational vision, determined leadership, and financial support," moved to a  campus in Irvington, which at the time was an independent suburb of Indianapolis. The campus consisted of several buildings, including an observatory, most of which were demolished in 1939. The Bona Thompson Library at the intersection of Downey and University avenues, designed by architects Henry H. Dupont and Jesse T. Johnson, is the only remaining building, although several buildings that housed faculty remain, including the Benton House.

Fairview campus

Enrollment at Butler increased following the end of World War I, prompting the administration to examine the need for a larger campus. The new and current campus, designed in part by noted architect George Sheridan, was formed on the site of Fairview Park, a former amusement park on the city's northwest side. Classes began on the campus in 1928.

Buildings

The first building on the Fairview campus was Arthur Jordan Memorial Hall, designed by Robert Frost Daggett and Thomas Hibben. The structure's Collegiate Gothic style of architecture, also used in the original William Tinsley-designed 13th Street and College Avenue building, set the tone for subsequent buildings erected on the campus over the next three decades. Also, in 1928, the Butler Fieldhouse (later renamed Hinkle Fieldhouse) was completed after being designed by architect Fermor Spencer Cannon. The building remained the largest indoor sports facility in the state until the mid-1960s. The Religion Building and Sweeney Chapel were completed in 1942. These structures, designed by Burns and James, were remodeled into Robertson Hall in 1966. The building now serves as the university's alumni and admissions offices.

Following World War II, construction began on the student center, Atherton Union (designed by McGuire and Shook). This building was remodeled in 1993 and includes an on-campus Starbucks. McGuire and Shook also designed Ross Hall, a dormitory originally designed for men but is now coed, and Schwitzer Hall, a women's dormitory. Art Lindbergh, with help from Daggett, designed the Holcomb Observatory and Planetarium, which was dedicated in 1955. This building houses Indiana's largest telescope.

Acclaimed architect Minoru Yamasaki, who designed the World Trade Center, designed Irwin Library, which opened in 1963 and serves as the university's main library. Also, in the early 1960s, Lilly Hall and Clowes Memorial Hall were constructed following the move of the Arthur Jordan Conservatory of Music to the campus. Clowes Hall, which opened in 1963, was co-designed by Indianapolis architect Evans Woollen III (founder of Woollen, Molzan and Partners) and John M. Johansen (of New Canaan, Connecticut). Ten years following the construction of Clowes Hall and Irwin Library, the science complex of Gallahue Hall and the Holcomb Research Institute (now known as Holcomb Building) were built, completing the "U" shaped complex of academic buildings. The Holcomb Building now houses the College of Business, Ruth Lilly Science Library, and Information Technology.

The Residential College ("ResCo"), designed by James and Associates, was the university's last major construction project of the twentieth century. Completed in 1990 the building serves as a cafeteria and a dormitory. In 2001, the Fairbanks Center for Communication and Technology was opened to house the school's communication programs of communication studies, journalism, and media arts as well as computer science. The Fairbanks Center houses two multi-purpose studios for video, television, and music production, as well as three professional music and audio recording studios. Early 2004 saw the addition of the Eidson-Duckwall Recital Hall onto Robertson Hall. The 140-seat concert venue serves as a showplace for student, faculty, and guest recitals.

Butler built the  Health and Recreation Complex (HRC) in 2005. Opening in 2006, the HRC offers a jogging track around a two-court gymnasium, an aquatic complex, free-weight room, cardio and selectorized weight machine area, fitness assessment and massage therapy room, a sauna, two multipurpose rooms, and locker rooms. Outside of the dedicated fitness space, the building houses a health center, counseling and consultation services, conference room, juice bar, and student lounge.

The Apartment Village also opened in 2006 as housing for juniors and seniors. Each apartment contains four private bedrooms with a single bed, dresser, and desk with a chair; two bathrooms; a full kitchen, including a dishwasher, disposal, microwave, and a four-stool dining counter; air-conditioning; cable television; and Ethernet and wireless access in each room. The Village has a centrally located community center, The Dawghouse, which includes a convenience store, a career and computer resource lab, a game room, laundry facilities, and a staffed resource desk.

This building, designed by Browning Day Mullins Dierdorf, is home to faculty offices, classrooms, and laboratories to support Butler's Pharmacy and Physician Assistant (PA) programs.

In 2013, the Howard L. Schrott Center for the Arts opened. It features a 450-seat performance hall and sustainable "green" parking improvements.

Facilities has overall responsibility for planning, maintaining, and building Butler's campus.

Academics

Over 60 major academic fields of study, 8 pre-professional programs, and 19 graduate programs are offered in six academic colleges: Arts, Business, Communication, Education, Liberal Arts and Sciences, and Pharmacy and Health Sciences. Butler ranks 1st for Midwest Regional Universities in U.S. News & World Reports 2019 Best Colleges. The university emphasizes the practicality of knowledge and offers individual attention to its students with its small class size and no teaching assistants. Butler University increased its focus on faculty and student research with the Butler Institute for Research and Scholarship (BIRS), bolstered by a $1 million grant from Lilly Endowment. The university also provides student research opportunities, such as the Butler Summer Institute, a 10-week program in which Butler students are granted funding to perform independent research with a faculty member.

The university is organized into the following schools and colleges:
 Andre B. Lacy School of Business
 College of Communication
 College of Education
 College of Liberal Arts and Sciences
 College of Pharmacy and Health Sciences
 Jordan College of the Arts

Athletics

Butler's athletic teams, known as the Bulldogs, compete in Division I of the NCAA. On July 1, 2012, the Bulldogs left the Horizon League, their conference home since 1979, for the Atlantic 10 Conference. Since the A-10 does not sponsor football, the Butler football team plays in the FCS's Pioneer League. The women's golf team at Butler joined the Metro Atlantic Athletic Conference, as the A-10 sponsors the sport only for men.

On March 20, 2013, it was officially announced that Butler would leave the Atlantic 10 Conference and became a founding member of the reconfigured Big East Conference July 1, 2013.

In the past decade, Butler teams have captured 26 conference championships (in four different leagues). The Bulldogs have made appearances in NCAA National Championship Tournaments in men's and women's basketball, men's soccer, volleyball, men's cross country, lacrosse, and baseball. Butler won the James J. McCafferty trophy, awarded annually by the Horizon League for all-sports excellence based on conference championship points, seven times, including three-straight from 1996–97 to 1998–99 and back-to-back years in 2001–02 and 2002–03, 2006–07, and 2009–10.

Men's basketball

The Butler program was one of the most successful "mid-major" basketball programs from 2000 to 2011, having won at least 20 games and reached postseason play eight of the last ten seasons, including six NCAA tournament appearances. Butler also holds two national championships in men's basketball from the pre-tournament era: one from 1924 (earned via the AAU national tournament), and one from 1929 (selected by the Veteran Athletes of Philadelphia).

In 2010 and 2011, Butler qualified for consecutive national championship games. The 2010 Butler team, led by star player Gordon Hayward, advanced to the national championship game where they lost a close game to Duke. With a total enrollment of only 4,500 students, Butler is the smallest school to play for a national championship since the tournament expanded to 64 teams in 1985. In 2011, the Bulldogs advanced to the championship game but finished as runners-up again, this time losing to Connecticut.

Butler has the best winning percentage and most wins of all Division I men's basketball programs in the state of Indiana over the last decade (21.6 wins per year through 2006). Until the 2015 Round of 32 loss in overtime to the Irish, Butler had won the previous six meetings with in-state rival Notre Dame and two of the last four against Indiana. Butler defeated both Notre Dame and Indiana during 2006–07 regular season, while also defeating in-state rival Purdue to move to 2–0 against the Boilermakers this decade. Butler has also been the defending champion of the Hoosier Classic men's basketball tournament since the 2001–02 season, and has advanced to postseason play nine of the last eleven years (7 NCAAs, 2 NITs). Butler has been to 15 NCAA Tournaments and three NITs since 1997.

Football

Over the course of 81 seasons from 1932 to 2013, Bulldog football teams have won 34 conference championships. This includes seven straight Indiana Collegiate Conference titles from 1934 to 1940, league titles in 1946, 1947, 1952, and 1953, and seven straight from 1958 to 1964, all under Tony Hinkle. Following the move from the College Division to NCAA Division II, Butler won 4 straight conference championships from 1972 to 1975, and in 1977, all under the guidance of Bill Sylvester, Sr. Butler went on to win league titles in 1983, 1985, and three straight from 1987 to 1989, under coach Bill Lynch. The Bulldogs also went to the NCAA Division II playoffs in 1983 and 1988. Butler and fellow HCC member schools joined with the Great Lakes Valley Conference to form the Midwest Intercollegiate Football Conference (now the Great Lakes Intercollegiate Athletic Conference). Butler's football dominance continued in this new conference with MIFC Conference Championships in both 1991 and 1992. These championships included a trip to the NCAA Division II playoffs in 1991 pairing Butler against eventual Division II champion Pittsburg State.

Following the 1992 season, Butler and member school Valparaiso moved up to NCAA Division I-AA (now Division I FCS) to join with Dayton, Drake, Evansville, and San Diego to form the Pioneer Football League. Butler won another conference championship in 1994. In this era, "the Dawgs" were led by Arnold Mickens who broke numerous NCAA Division I rushing records, including eight straight  performances during the campaign. In 2009, Butler won its 32nd league title by winning the Pioneer Football League championship under Coach Jeff Voris. The Bulldogs set a school record with 11 wins and went on to the Gridiron Classic, winning over Central Connecticut State 28–23. The Bulldogs' latest championships came in 2012 and 2013 when the Bulldogs won seven league victories each season to secure the share of the PFL Championships. This is the Bulldogs' fourth PFL Championship and the third in the last five years. Butler also earned a berth to the 2013 Division I FCS playoffs, the PFL's first automatic bid for the Division I football championships.

Hoosier Helmet Trophy
The Hoosier Helmet Trophy was established as the trophy helmet for the rivalry football game played between Butler and Valparaiso University. The Hoosier Helmet was created prior to the 2006 season to commemorate the football rivalry that has existed since 1921. The helmet trophy was created to further intensify the rivalry between these two teams. A group of Butler players, along with their head coach, Jeff Voris, came up with the idea. After Valparaiso head coach Stacey Adams agreed to play for the helmet, Butler equipment manager John Harding put the trophy together.

The white helmet is mounted on a hardwood plaque and features each team's logo on the respective sides of the helmet. A gold plate is added each year to commemorate the winner and score of the contest. Currently, Butler holds a 9–4 series lead when playing for the Hoosier Helmet. Both Butler and Valparaiso compete in the NCAA Division I-FCS (formerly Division I-AA), non-scholarship Pioneer Football League.

Men's soccer
Butler's men's soccer qualified for the NCAA Tournament in 1995, 1997, 1998, 2001, 2009, 2010, 2016, and 2017, reaching the round of 16 in 1995, 1998, and 2017. Butler won the Big East tournament title in 2016 and the Horizon League (formerly the MCC) tournament titles in 1995, 1997, 1998, 2001, and 2010. They also won or shared the regular-season title seven times, including 1994, 1996, 1998, 2004, 2008, 2009 and 2010. The 1998 squad enjoyed national rankings as high as No. 8 in the country, and the 2010 squad finished the regular season as the only undefeated team nationally and were ranked as high as No. 6 in the country.

Cross country
Some of Butler's most notable athletic accomplishments have come in cross country. Butler won 13 straight Horizon League Championships in men's cross country and 8 women's championships. Since moving to the Big East, both teams have captured Big East Conference Championships. The men's team placed 4th in the nation in 2004 earning a team trophy at the NCAA Division I championships, and finished 13th in the nation at the 2020 NCAA Division 1 championships. Both teams have frequently qualified for nationals in recent years, placing individuals as high as 3rd (Mark Tucker, 2003). All-Americans from the Butler cross country team include Julius Mwangi, Justin Young, Fraser Thompson (A Rhodes Scholar), Mark Tucker, Olly Laws, and Andrew Baker, Katie Clark, Mara Olson, Erik Peterson, Olivia Pratt, Euan Makepeace, and Simon Bedard. Former coach Joe Franklin was named NCAA Division I Coach of the Year for leading the Bulldogs to their 2004 4th-place finish. In 2013, the women's cross country team added another trophy finish by placing 3rd in the country at the NCAA cross country championships. With the recent move into the Big East Conference, Butler has aligned itself with some of the most notable programs in the country.

Student life

Students at Butler University participate in more than 150 student organizations and dozens of club and intramural sports, and many multi-cultural programs and services. More than 94 percent of students are involved in campus activities.

Greek organizations
Greek life is a popular option at Butler with over 35 percent of undergraduates becoming members of social fraternities or sororities. Fraternities and sororities have long been a part of student life at Butler, with the first fraternity established in 1859, and the first sorority established in 1874. Today, representatives from each of the seven active fraternities make up the Interfraternity Council (IFC), which coordinates men's recruitment and works with the Panhellenic Council to plan all-campus events. The Panhellenic Council has representatives from each of Butler's seven active sororities and women's fraternities.

Interfraternity Council chapters
 Delta Tau Delta—Beta Zeta chapter (est. 1878)
 Phi Delta Theta—Indiana Gamma chapter (est. 1859)
 Sigma Chi—Rho chapter (est. 1865)
 Sigma Nu—Epsilon Mu chapter (est. 1926)
 Beta Theta Pi - Alpha Psi Chapter (re-est. 2017)
 Lambda Chi Alpha - Alpha Alpha Zeta (re-est. 2019)
 Phi Kappa Psi—Indiana Zeta chapter (re-est. 2021)

Panhellenic Council chapters
 Alpha Chi Omega—Alpha Chi chapter (est. 1925)
 Alpha Phi—Epsilon Beta chapter (est. 1967)
 Delta Delta Delta—Delta Lambda chapter (est. 1914, closed 1995, re-est. 2005)
 Delta Gamma—Alpha Tau chapter (est. 1925)
 Kappa Kappa Gamma—Mu chapter (est. 1878)
 Kappa Alpha Theta—Gamma chapter (est. 1874, closed 1886, re-est. 1906)
 Pi Beta Phi—Indiana Gamma chapter (est. 1897)

Closed chapters
 Zeta Tau Alpha—Alpha Delta chapter (1920–1956)
 Alpha Delta Theta—Epsilon chapter (1923–1933)
 Delta Zeta—Alpha Nu chapter (1924–1935)
 Alpha Delta Pi—Alpha Phi chapter (1925–1933)
 Alpha Omicron Pi—Beta Theta chapter (1927–1940)
 Alpha Sigma Alpha (1928–1933)
 Kappa Delta Rho—Omicron chapter (1928-1937)
 Sigma Sigma Sigma—Alpha Eta chapter (1928–1933)
 Pi Kappa Sigma—Alpha Iota chapter (1929–1937)
 Kappa Delta—Alpha Omega chapter (1931–1935)
 Tau Kappa Epsilon—Gamma Psi chapter (1951–2012)

National Panhellenic Council chapters
On Sunday, November 12, 1922, the Alpha chapter of Sigma Gamma Rho was founded at Butler University by a mix of undergraduate and graduate students. The sorority had its beginnings on the original Irvington campus of Butler University. While most NPHC undergraduate chapters have citywide memberships with students from more than one university, the Alpha chapter of Sigma Gamma Rho is composed only of Butler students. Part of the original Divine Nine of Black Greek letter organizations, Sigma Gamma Rho is one of two Indiana based historically all-black Greek organizations in the state.

Today there is a commemorative stained glass window located just outside the tower room at the south end of Atherton Union, as well as decorative bricks on the right side of Atherton.

Sigma Gamma Rho—Alpha chapter (est. 1922)

Service and professional fraternities
 Alpha Kappa Psi, National Professional Business Society, Lambda Upsilon chapter
 Alpha Phi Omega, National Coed Service Fraternity, Alpha Tau chapter
 Alpha Psi Omega, Theatre Professional Society, Omicron Epsilon chapter
 Kappa Psi, National Professional Society in Pharmacy
 Lambda Kappa Sigma, International Fraternity of Women in Pharmacy
 Mu Phi Epsilon, Professional Music Education Society
 Sigma Alpha Iota, International Women's Music Fraternity
 Sigma Rho Delta, National Dance Society, Alpha chapter (est. 1967)
 Phi Delta Chi, National Professional Pharmacy Society, Alpha Phi chapter (est. 1955)
 Phi Mu Alpha Sinfonia, National Music Fraternity, Alpha Sigma chapter

Honor societies
 Kappa Delta Pi, National Honorary Society in Education
 Kappa Kappa Psi, National Honorary Band Society, Alpha Beta chapter (est. 1929)
 Lambda Pi Eta, National Communication Honorary Society, Upsilon Delta chapter (est. 2007)
 Pi Sigma Alpha, National Political Science Honorary Society, Sigma Gamma chapter
 Pi Kappa Delta, National Forensics Honorary (dedicated to Speech and Debate), Zeta chapter (2011)
 Sigma Delta Pi, National Collegiate Hispanic Honor Society, Delta Upsilon chapter
 Sigma Pi Sigma, Physics Honorary Society
 Tau Beta Sigma, National Honorary Band Society, Epsilon chapter (est. 1946)
 Upsilon Pi Epsilon, Computer and Information Honorary Society (est. 2001)
 Phi Beta Kappa, Academic Honor Society (est. 2009)
 Phi Eta Sigma, National Honorary Society for Freshmen
 Phi Lambda Sigma, National Pharmacy Honorary Society, Pi chapter
 Rho Chi, Professional Honorary Society for Students and Professors of Pharmacy, Alpha Phi chapter (est. 1953)
 Psi Chi, International Honor Society in Psychology (est. 1997)
 Order of Omega, National Greek Leadership Society, Nu Upsilon Chapter (est. 1993)

Spiritual organizations
The Center for Faith and Vocation (known on campus as "The Blue House") is the hub for campus faith communities. The CFV helps students connect their spiritual journeys with career goals. The CFV places students in internship experiences to help determine their vocation. The Faculty/Staff Workshop—held twice a year—trains staff and faculty on how to help students live lives of purpose and meaning.

Faith communities on campus:
 Butler Catholic Community
 Butler Meditation Group
 Coalition for Christian Outreach (non-denominational)
 Converge (non-denominational Christian)
 Cru (evangelical Christian)
 Grace Unlimited
 Hillel
 Muslim Student Association
 Orthodox Christian Association
 Reclaimed (United Methodist)
 Secular Student Alliance
 Voices of Deliverance
 Young Life

Competitive organizations
 Forensics (Speech and Debate)
 Esports Teams

Notable people

Alumni

 Clotilde Betances Jaeger, feminist writer and journalist
 Stanley A. Cain, botanist and plant ecologist
 Kevin Calabro, play-by-play announcer in basketball and Seattle sports radio host
 Ed Carpenter, IndyCar Series driver
 Grace Julian Clarke, author, journalist, and women's suffrage activist
 Barry S. Collier, current Butler University athletic director and former head basketball coach at Butler and University of Nebraska
 Arthur C. Cope, chemist and originator of the Cope reaction and Cope rearrangement
 Richard N. Côté, author and lecturer
 George Daugherty, conductor of major American and international symphony orchestras; Emmy winner and 5-time Emmy nominee
 Scott Drew, Baylor University men's basketball coach
 Sarah Fisher, IndyCar Series driver
 Luke Flynn, composer
 Talitha Gerlach, American YWCA worker who spent most of her life as a social worker in Shanghai, China
 John V. Hadley, Justice of the Indiana Supreme Court
 Lawson Harvey, Justice of the Indiana Supreme Court
 Gordon Hayward, professional basketball player and professional e-sports athlete
 Bill Hazen, play-by-play announcer in basketball and syndicated radio host
 Howard A. Howe, polio researcher
 Freddie Hubbard, trumpeter and composer
 Robert M. Jacobson, chair of pediatrics at Mayo Clinic
 Dan Johnson, professional baseball player
 Jim Jones, cult leader who ordered a mass suicide and mass murder of 918 commune members in 1978
 David Starr Jordan, president of Indiana University and first president of Stanford University
 Peter Kassig, aid worker taken hostage and ultimately beheaded by The Islamic State 
 Mark Kurlansky, journalist and writer of general interest non-fiction
 Todd Lickliter, former University of Iowa men's basketball head coach and former Butler basketball head coach
 Peter Lupus, bodybuilder and actor
 Shelvin Mack, professional basketball player
 Thad Matta, former Ohio State University men's basketball head coach and both former and current Butler basketball head coach
 Elizabeth Miller (1878–1961), novelist
 Pat Neshek, professional baseball player
 Harry S. New, U.S. Senator from Indiana and United States Postmaster General
 Ronald Nored, head coach of the NBA D-League Long Island Nets
 Madge Oberholtzer, Indiana state employee whose death at the hands of D.C. Stephenson hastened the demise of the Ku Klux Klan in the state
 Scott Overall, Olympic athlete
 Johann Sebastian Paetsch, musician and cellist
 Rebecca Paul, Tennessee Lottery president and CEO
 Linley E. Pearson, 37th Indiana Attorney General
 Karen Pence, former Second Lady of the United States
 Ryan Pepiot, professional baseball pitcher
 Bobby Plump, Indiana Basketball Hall of Fame inductee, and hero of the 1954 Milan High School team whose story provided the basis for the 1986 film Hoosiers
 Richard Roudebush, former Indiana Congressman
 George Ryan, former Illinois governor
 Chris Salvi, professional football player
 Avriel Shull, architect
 Jay Stewart, television and radio announcer
 Wendi C. Thomas, journalist and founder of MLK50
 Elaine C. Wagner, Rear Admiral, United States Navy) and 36th Chief, United States Navy Dental Corps
 Ryan Ward, professional lacrosse, PE & health teacher
 Maurine Dallas Watkins, journalist, playwright; author of play Chicago
Tyler Wideman (born 1995), basketball player in the Israeli National League
Garo Yepremian, Miami Dolphins placekicker
 Marguerite Young, author of poetry, fiction, non-fiction, and criticism

Faculty and staff
 Igor Buketoff, conductor and teacher
 Gordon Clark, philosopher and Calvinist theologian
 Michael J. Colburn, 27th Director of the United States Marine Band and a colonel in the Marine Corps.
 Joe Franklin, 2004 NCAA Division I Cross Country Coach of the Year
 Paul D. "Tony" Hinkle, developed the orange basketball
 Henry Leck, Associate Professor of Music and Director of Indianapolis Children's Choir
 Catharine Merrill, first Demia Butler Chair of English Literature
 Walter Myers Jr., Justice of the Indiana Supreme Court, taught business law
 Susan Neville, current Demia Butler Chair in English, author, and creative writing professor
 Matt Pivec, saxophonist
 Samuel E. Perkins, Justice of the Indiana Supreme Court, taught law
 Michael Schelle, composer and teacher
 Marvin Scott, professor, former President of St. Paul's College, Virginia, and 2004 Republican Candidate for the U.S. Senate
 Brad Stevens, a former head basketball coach from 2007 to 2013, former coach and current President of Basketball Operations of the Boston Celtics
 Emma Lou Thornbrough, historian of the Midwest and of African American history

See also

Notes

References

External links

 
 Butler Athletics website
 

 
Educational institutions established in 1855
1855 establishments in Indiana
Universities and colleges in Indianapolis
Private universities and colleges in Indiana
Universities and colleges accredited by the Higher Learning Commission